Tiffany Louise Sessions (born October 29, 1968) is a missing woman from Tampa, Florida, who was last seen on February 9, 1989. Her family nickname was "Tiffy". She was attending college at the University of Florida in Gainesville and was majoring in business.

Disappearance

On the afternoon of Sessions' disappearance, she told her roommate that she was going out alone for a power walk. Between 4:00 and 5:00 in the afternoon, Sessions left her apartment on SW 35th Place. Sessions left her wallet, identification, and keys in her apartment. Sessions was wearing a white pullover sweatshirt with long sleeves and grey horizontal striping with "Aspen" printed on the front of the shirt's collar, red sweatpants, and tennis shoes. She was also wearing a two-tone silver and gold women's Rolex wrist watch and was carrying a black Sony Walkman.

After five hours, when Sessions had still not returned, her roommate alerted Sessions' mother that her daughter was missing. The police did not initially handle the disappearance as a crime because a crime scene had not been found. There was no sign that Sessions had left her apartment's parking lot, nor were there any signs of a struggle.

People who were in the area of Sessions' disappearance have stated that someone fitting Sessions' description was seen speaking to individuals sitting inside a vehicle. Eyewitnesses were uncertain whether the woman entered the vehicle, and authorities have never confirmed that the individual in question was Sessions.

Investigation
Michael Christopher Knickerbocker was considered a suspect in Sessions' disappearance. While Knickerbocker was in prison serving five consecutive life sentences, he reportedly told his fellow inmates that he had murdered Sessions. He also said he had chained Sessions to a tree and discarded her body close to Fort Myers in the Caloosahatchee River, but because Knickerbocker was not living in Gainesville at the time of Sessions' disappearance, the feasibility of his involvement has been questioned.

, police believe that now-deceased and convicted serial-killer Paul Eugene Rowles was responsible for Sessions' disappearance and murder. At the time Sessions disappeared, Rowles was working for a construction-related company near the path where Sessions was last seen. Rowles did not show for work the day Sessions went missing. Rowles had kept an address book with information on people he had murdered (discovered by investigators in January 2013 following interviews with Rowles; he died a month later). The book listed Linda Fida, known to be one of his victims, as the first woman he killed; it may also contain a cryptic reference to Elizabeth Foster (another known victim whose body was found about one mile from where Sessions disappeared). Notably the book contained a notation "#2 2/9/89 #2", believed by investigators to refer to Sessions' date of disappearance, and to identify her as Rowles' second victim.

Sessions has been excluded from 150 unidentified decedents in the United States.

Finding Tiffany Sessions projects and aftermath 
The FBI have said the search for Sessions is the largest in Florida's history. Public efforts to find Sessions include the Charley Project, and the Tiffany Sessions Facebook Project Page. The Sessions family are offering a $25,000 reward for any information in the case. They have worked closely with the Alachua County Sheriff's Department and the Florida Department of Law Enforcement to find Sessions' remains or convict any suspects involved in this case. In 2013 detective Kevin Allen said he had made finding Sessions his number one case. Sessions' mother Hillary has written a book about her missing daughter called Where's My Tiffany?, describing her joy in raising Tiffany and her heartbreak in losing her.

See also
List of people who disappeared

References

External links

1980s missing person cases
1989 in Florida
Articles containing video clips
February 1989 events in the United States
Gainesville, Florida
History of Florida
History of women in Florida
Missing person cases in Florida
University of Florida